The 1952 Western Illinois Leathernecks football team represented Western Illinois University as a member of the Interstate Intercollegiate Athletic Conference (IIAC) during the 1952 college football season. They were led by fourth-year head coach Vince DiFrancesca and played their home games at Hanson Field. The Leathernecks finished the season with a 7–2 record overall and a 5–1 record in conference play, placing second in the IIAC.

Schedule

References

Western Illinois
Western Illinois Leathernecks football seasons
Western Illinois Leathernecks football